Coolderry GAA is a Gaelic Athletic Association club located in the town of Coolderry in County Offaly, Ireland. The club is the most successful side in the Offaly Senior Hurling Championship with a record 31 titles. Its facilities include a clubhouse with four dressing rooms, floodlights, ball wall, two pitches, a running track and a gym. Its most recent win was 2018 beating Kilcormac Kiloughey.

History 
The club was founded in the early 1880s. Coolderry's first victory was in 1890 when Coolderry beat Kilcormac, but Offaly was not at that time affiliated to the 
central body, the win was not officially recognised. The team's first Senior Final winning team was in 1899. Between 1899 and 1916 Coolderry won 10 Senior Titles, and in the 10 Championship Finals they only conceded 2 goals. Coolderry have appeared in 48 Offaly Senior Hurling Finals. In 2011, Coolderry won their first ever Leinster Senior Club Hurling Championship title.

Honours 
 Leinster Senior Club Hurling Championship (1): 2011
 Offaly Senior Hurling Championship (30): 1899, 1901, 1903, 1904, 1905, 1906, 1910, 1911, 1914, 1916, 1917, 1926, 1931, 1939, 1942, 1945, 1947, 1949, 1953, 1956, 1961, 1962, 1963, 1977, 1980, 1986, 2004, 2010, 2011, 2015, 2018 
 Offaly Intermediate Hurling Championship (5): 1985, 1986, 1988, 2001, 2005
 Offaly Junior A Hurling Championship (6) 1908, 1909, 1913, 1914, 1918, 1931

Famous Hurlers
Stephen Connolly
Joe Brady
Pat Carroll
Brian Carroll
Pat McLoughney
Cathal Parlon
 Barry Teehan
David King

References

External links
Official Coolderry GAA Club website

Gaelic games clubs in County Offaly
Hurling clubs in County Offaly